Aston by Budworth is a civil parish in the unitary authority of Cheshire East and the ceremonial county of Cheshire, England.  The main villages in the parish are Arley, which is the site of Arley Hall, and Bate Heath. According to the 2001 census the parish had a population of 281.

See also

Listed buildings in Aston by Budworth
Aston Park, Cheshire

External links

 

Villages in Cheshire
Civil parishes in Cheshire